The 2006–07 Slovenian Second League season started on 13 August 2006 and ended on 27 May 2007. Each team played a total of 27 matches.

League standing

See also
2006–07 Slovenian PrvaLiga
2006–07 Slovenian Third League

References
NZS archive

External links
Football Association of Slovenia 

Slovenian Second League seasons
2006–07 in Slovenian football
Slovenia